Aleksei Aleksandrovich Gubarev (29 March 1931 – 21 February 2015) was a Soviet cosmonaut who flew on two space flights: Soyuz 17 and Soyuz 28.

Biography 
Gubarev graduated from the Soviet Naval Aviation School in 1952 and went on to serve with the Soviet Air Force. He undertook further studies at the Gagarin Air Force Academy before being accepted into the space programme.

He was originally trained for the Soviet lunar programme and for military Soyuz flights before training for Salyut missions. His next mission, in 1978, was Soyuz 28, the first Interkosmos flight, where he was accompanied by Vladimír Remek from Czechoslovakia.

In 1971, he became backup commander for the ill-fated Soyuz 11 mission, which killed the three-man crew when the craft depressurized in space.

He resigned as a cosmonaut in 1981 and took up an administrative position at the Gagarin Cosmonaut Training Centre.

In the 1980s he worked at the 30th Central Scientific Research Institute, Ministry of Defence (Russia).

His awards includes the Gagarin Gold Medal, which was bestowed upon him twice.   He was an honorary citizen of Kaluga, Arkalyk, Tselinograd, and Prague.

Gubarev published a book, The Attraction of Weightlessness, in 1982.

Gubarev died at the age of 83 on 21 February 2015.

Honours and awards
Twice Hero of the Soviet Union
Pilot-Cosmonaut of the USSR
Two Orders of Lenin
Medal "For Merit in Space Exploration" (Russian Federation)
Medal "For the Development of Virgin Lands"

Foreign awards:
Hero of the Czechoslovak Socialist Republic
Order of Klement Gottwald (Czechoslovak Socialist Republic)
Medal "For Strengthening Military Cooperation" (Czechoslovak Socialist Republic)
Medal of Sino-Soviet Friendship (People's Republic of China)
Medal "Brotherhood in Arms" (German Democratic Republic)

References

External links

1931 births
2015 deaths
People from Samara Oblast
Soviet major generals
Soviet Air Force generals
Soviet Navy personnel
Soviet cosmonauts
Russian aviators
Heroes of the Soviet Union
Recipients of the Order of Lenin
Heroes of the Czechoslovak Socialist Republic
Burials at the Federal Military Memorial Cemetery
Salyut program cosmonauts